"Red Flavor" is a song recorded by South Korean girl group Red Velvet for their first Korean special extended play, The Red Summer (2017). It was released as the lead single from the EP on July 9, 2017, through SM Entertainment and was distributed by Genie Music, along with the accompanying fruit-infused music video. Written by SM collaborator Kenzie and produced by Daniel Caesar and Ludwig Lindell (known collectively as Caesar & Loui), it is primarily a dance-pop song with synths and percussion. The song reflects the summer funky vibe, while the lyrics hint towards a young relationship with summer references. A Japanese version of the song, adapted by songwriter Kami Kaoru, was later included on the group's first Japanese EP, #Cookie Jar, on July 4, 2018.

"Red Flavor" was well received by music critics; the song has appeared on several critics year-end lists and was awarded Best Pop Song at the 15th Korean Music Awards. In 2019, Billboard ranked it as the second greatest K-pop song of the 2010s. The song was a commercial success in South Korea, becoming Red Velvet's first number-one on the Gaon Digital Chart, their longest-charting single to date on said chart, and their fifth song to sell over one million downloads. It additionally peaked at number four on the Billboard World Digital Songs chart in the United States, and was the group's first single to enter the Billboard charts in Japan and the Philippines.

Since its release, Red Velvet has performed "Red Flavor" for all of their headlining concert tours. The song was performed at the Spring is Coming concert in Pyongyang at the East Pyongyang Grand Theatre (alongside "Bad Boy") to an audience that included Korean Workers' Party chairman Kim Jong-un. Seen as an act of a wider diplomatic initiative between South Korea and North Korea, the group's appearance at the concert made them only the fifth idol group to have performed in North Korea and the first artist from SM in 15 years, since boy group Shinhwa. The song has also been adapted into an orchestral version by Seoul Philharmonic Orchestra, featuring the arrangement of Park In-young.

Background and release 
After the release of their fourth extended play Rookie in February, Red Velvet released the digital single "Would U" as the first release for the second season of the label project SM Station in March 2017. It was the group's first single as a quartet in years due to member Joy's filming schedule for her first drama The Liar and His Lover (2017), in which she was starring as the female lead. Through Star-News and SM Entertainment's official press announcement on June 23, 2017, they were reported to have recently finished filming a music video. It eventually became Red Velvet's second comeback within a calendar year, which was later extended to a total of three times with the release of their second studio album Perfect Velvet in late November 2017. On June 30, the first batch of teaser photos were posted on the group's official social media accounts. The EP's title and its full tracklist, which included "Red Flavor", were revealed on the same day. The song had its official digital release on July 9, 2017, along with The Red Summer.

Recording and composition 

"Red Flavor" was produced by Daniel Caesar and Ludwig Lindell (under the name of Caesar & Loui), who had previously worked with several South Korean artists in this name. In an interview with Tone Glow, the duo revealed that it had originally been written for the British girl group Little Mix with the title "Dance With Nobody". After deciding that the song could also work for the K-pop market, they recorded the demo with vocals by Ylva Dimberg whose voice is still heard in the background vocals in the pre-chorus. A low voice was featured in the intro and chorus of the song.

Musically, Tamar Herman of Billboard characterized "Red Flavor" as an electropop song with "dramatic synths and a percussive melody". It is composed in the key of A major, with a tempo of 125 beats per minute.  Hwang Sun-eob of IZM noted the "sensuous composition of the bassline or synthesizer". In addition, Chase McMullen of The 405 noted that the song includes a "clap-along groove". Its Korean lyrics, which were written by long-time SM songwriter Kenzie, Caesar, and Lindell focuses on the theme of "fruit-flavored summer love". Initially released in Korean, a Japanese version of the song was performed at their first Japan showcase on November 6, 2017. The Japanese version of "Red Flavor" was then included on Red Velvet's first Japanese EP #Cookie Jar (2018), with the single of the same name. The Japanese version of the song was adapted by songwriter Kami Kaoru.

Critical reception and recognition 
Following its initial release, "Red Flavor" was met with positive reviews from music critics. Tamar Herman of Billboard magazine called the track "dynamic in its jam-packed, but not overpowering production" and concluded that it is "sure to be one of the summer's K-pop earworms". Jeff Benjamin of Fuse described the song as a "super-simple-to-swallow piece of pop", giving credit to the "cheery-chanty melody", which he pointed to as one of Red Velvet's more accessible tunes. McMullen complimented the song as an "effortless pop glide", while Lee Gi-seon of IZM magazine, in a review of the EP, reacted positively to the unity of the group presented throughout the song. Moreover, an individual single review from writer Hwang Sun-eob of IZM praised the "unusual" synthesizer and bassline of the track, citing the overall production for its "good" compromisation between the two to create their "favorite summer taste". Chester Chin of The Star labelled the song an "in-your-face summer jam" and added that it was "relentlessly catchy". Taylor Glasby of Dazed commented that the song "shouldn't be seen as merely a quirky fix", stating: "It's complex and intimidating and that it feels so immediate and identifiable on the surface is just emblematic of its greatness." With the mighty punch of its chorus, she claimed the song "completely won the summer".

GQ Korea named "Red Flavor" its Song of the Year in the magazine's November 2017 issue. In December, IZM listed the song as one of its top 10 singles of the year. That same month, Sun Mi-kyung of Osen included the track on their Memorable Songs of 2017 list, citing its addictiveness and longevity on the charts, and called the song's hook "one of the best bars that hit the music industry". Dazed ranked the song at number two on its list of the 20 Best K-pop Songs of 2017. The song landed on Billboards 20 Best K-Pop Songs 2017 list at number four, with Jeff Benjamin praising its uplifting, addictive, deliciously bubblegum melody. The magazine later featured "Red Flavor" in their decennial staff list of The 100 Greatest K-Pop Songs of the 2010s published in November 2019, at number two. In the article, J.M.K. cited the song's "overflow[ing] with an exuberance that's palpable from the very first second" as the reason why it "was such an undeniable hit since day one and remains ever-beloved by fans worldwide". They further wrote that the song's "evocations of a bright summer romance", which are "felt in every flourish and quirk", helped "Red Velvet make tangible the most ineffable of things: love" in "three short minutes". The song also landed on Melon's domestic Top 100 Songs of Past Decade (2010–2019) list at number nine among idol groups and 29 overall. In 2021, news outlet EToday designated "Red Flavor" one of 6 Songs that Remind You of Summer. It described the song as "an energetic, uptempo genre that makes your shoulders dance" with "impressive" lyrics, and called it Red Velvet's "signature summer season song".

 Accolades 
Following the group's initial South Korea music shows promotion, Red Velvet earned their first Show Champion trophy for "Red Flavor" on July 20, 2017, and continued to achieve a total of five trophies by the end of July 2017. It was nominated for the Song of the Year - July category at the 7th Gaon Chart Music Awards in 2018, but lost to labelmate Exo's "Ko Ko Bop". The song, however, won in the Best Digital Song category at the 32nd Golden Disc Awards, becoming the group's second time to win this category following "Ice Cream Cake" in 2016. "Red Flavor" also earned Red Velvet their first Korean Music Awards in their career in the Best Pop Song category. The song also received a nomination in the Song of the Year category at the 2017 Mnet Asian Music Awards, but lost to Twice's "Signal".

 Commercial performance 
Within the first 24 hours after its release, "Red Flavor" quickly topped seven Korean digital charts. On the third week of July 2017, the song debuted atop the Gaon Digital Chart for one week, giving Red Velvet their first number one on the chart since their debut in August 2014. It was also the group's second chart-topper on the component Gaon Download Chart with 291,643 downloads, scoring their best selling record in the first week while reaching number two on the Gaon Streaming Chart for four consecutive weeks. Following its appearance at number 20 on 2017's Gaon Year-End Digital Chart, "Red Flavor" became Red Velvet's longest-charting entry to date, having spent a total of 64 consecutive weeks within the top 100 of the Digital Chart, while re-appearing for 16 weeks on the lower half of the new top 200 as of September 2019. The song also debuted at number two on the Billboard K-pop Hot 100, making it their first top-five entry. As of September 2018, the song has sold over 2,500,000 downloads in South Korea, making it the group's fifth million-seller and currently their best selling single. Gaon also reported that the song has accumulated over 100 million streams, making it Red Velvet's second song to reach the milestone, following "Russian Roulette" (2016). The former appeared again as the 58th biggest hit single on 2018's Gaon Year-End Digital Chart, which saw the most year-end entries from the group with a total of four releases, including "Bad Boy" at number 26.

Elsewhere, the song debuted at number four on the US Billboard World Digital Song Sales chart, making it Red Velvet's third song to debut and peak at the same position following "Happiness" (2014) and "Rookie" (2017). The Korean version also debuted at number 24 and 25 on the Billboard Philippine Hot 100 and Billboard Japan Hot 100 respectively, marking the group's first entry and their highest peak to date on the Japanese chart.

 Music video 

 Background 
On July 7, 2017, a 19-second video teaser for "Red Flavor" was uploaded on the official SM Town channel, with the official video being released two days later. The visual was released on SM Entertainment's official YouTube channel on July 9, 2017, to coincide with the digital release of The Red Summer. Choreographed by Kyle Hanagami who had previously worked with the group for their singles "Be Natural" (2014), "Ice Cream Cake" (2015) and "Russian Roulette" (2016), the song's music video was directed by director Seong Chang-won. Joy recalled running into SM Entertainment founder Lee Soo-man at an SM Town dinner, who disclosed to her that he had been heavily involved in overseeing a lot for the song, including its lyrics, melody, rhythm, and even the choreography.

 Synopsis and reception 
The fruit-infused music video has a colorful summer theme that features all five members singing about love in the summer. It shows various scenes in where Red Velvet can be seen interviewing fruits, and appears on a small screen, expressing something with their hands, which turned out to be a sign language. It depicts people falling in love with colorful and intense colors, fruits and drinks over the lively pop beats. The song was highlighted by its colorful movements reminiscent of cheerleading.  Following the music video's release, writer Tamar Herman of Billboard described it as "evoking the tastes of fresh fruit, candy, ice cream and cocktails" further praising the video for its "vibrant seasonal romance" picture. The music video was included in Idology's 2017 Best Music Videos. The music video was also one of YouTube Korea's Top 10 Most Popular Music Videos of 2017. On September 10, 2018, the music video for the track reached 100 million views on YouTube.

 Live performances 
A day before its digital release, "Red Flavor" was performed live by Red Velvet for the first time at an SMTOWN concert in Seoul. Hours after the release on July 9, 2017, the group had their first music show performance on Inkigayo, where they also performed "You Better Know". They continued appearing on several music shows such as The Show, M Countdown, Music Bank, and Show Champion where they earned their first music show trophy for "Red Flavor" on July 20, 2017. The song was also part of Red Velvet's first solo concert tour Red Room in August 2017. It is the first Red Velvet song to be recorded and performed in Japanese, serving as their debut performance during a showcase in Japan on November 6, 2017, and later being performed during the Japanese leg of the annual SMTOWN Live World Tour. During the group's attendance at 2017 Mnet Asian Music Awards, they performed the Hitchhiker remix version of the song along with their November single "Peek-a-Boo". The second remix contained an anthemic EDM-breakdown after the final chorus.

As part of the group's attendance and performance at the Spring is Coming concert, which was intended as part of a wider diplomatic initiative between South Korea and North Korea, Red Velvet performed the song along with "Bad Boy" in Pyongyang at the East Pyongyang Grand Theatre to an audience that saw the appearance of Korean Workers' Party chairman Kim Jong-un. This made them only the fifth idol group to ever perform in North Korea and the first artist from SM Entertainment in 15 years since the performance of former labelmate Shinhwa.

 Credits and personnel 
Credits adapted from the liner notes of The Red Summer and #Cookie Jar.Studio Recorded and edited at SM Lyvin Studio
 Recorded at doobdoob Studio
 Recorded, edited, and mixed at SM Blue Cup StudioPersonnelRed Velvet (Irene, Seulgi, Wendy, Joy, Yeri) – vocals, background vocals
 Kenzie – Korean songwriter, vocal director
 Kami Kaoru – Japanese songwriter
 Daniel Caesar – original writer, arrangement
 Ludwig Lindell – original writer, arrangement

 Ylva Dimberg – background vocals
 Lee Ji-hong – recording, digital editing
 Ahn Chang-kyu – recording
 Jeong Eui-seok – recording, digital editing, mixing

 Charts 

 Weekly charts 

 Monthly charts 

 Year-end charts 

 Release history 

 Orchestra version 

"Red Flavor (Orchestra Version)" is an orchestral song recorded by South Korean orchestra Seoul Philharmonic Orchestra, re-established with the arrangement of Park In-young. SM Entertainment made its first collaboration with the orchestra forming a new classical label, SM Classics, creating an orchestral version of "Red Flavor". The music video for the "Red Flavor" orchestra features a 44-man orchestra performing "Red Flavor" under the direction of David Lee.

 Track listing 

 Digital download / streaming "Red Flavor (Orchestra Version)"3:21

 Credits and personnel 
Credits adapted from Melon and Tidal.Studio Recorded at Seoul Philharmonic Orchestra Rehearsal Room
 Recorded at Brickwall Sound
 Mixed at SM Concert Hall Studio
 Mastered at 821 Sound MasteringPersonnel'

Yoo Young-jinmusic and sound supervisor
 Park In-youngrecording director, background instrument
 David Leeconductor
 Seoul Philharmonic Orchestraperformer
 Moon Jung-jaepiano
 Hwang Hyunbackground instrument
 Lee Jong-hanbackground instrument
Monkey Media Grouprecording
Kang Hyo-minrecording
Moon Il-ohrecording assistant
 Namkoong Jinmixing
 Kwon Nam-woomastering

Release history

See also 
 List of Gaon Digital Chart number ones of 2017
List of M Countdown Chart winners (2017)
List of Inkigayo Chart winners (2017)

References 

2017 singles
2017 songs
Red Velvet (group) songs
SM Entertainment singles
Songs written by Kenzie (songwriter)
Korean-language songs
Gaon Digital Chart number-one singles
Electropop songs